Best of The Rasmus 2001–2009, also referred to as Best of.. 2001-2009 is a compilation album by the Finnish alternative rock band The Rasmus, it was released on November 2, 2009.
The album contains the best songs between 2001 and 2009. While most of the songs were already released, it features a new unreleased song called "October & April" which features vocals by Anette Olzon from Nightwish. This song was recorded during the same time as the other songs from the band's latest studio album Black Roses, but wasn't included as it didn't follow the album concept.

"Open My Eyes", appearing in acoustic live version on this album, is a b-side of the single Shot and originally taken from the UK edition of the album  Hide from the Sun (2005).

Overview
Singer Lauri Ylönen about the album:

Track listing

Personnel 

 Lauri Ylönen – vocals
 Eero Heinonen – bass
 Pauli Rantasalmi – guitar
 Aki Hakala – drums

Charts

References

External links
Playground Music: The Rasmus: Best of 2001–2009

The Rasmus albums
2009 greatest hits albums